Sir Edward Seymour, of Berry Pomeroy, 4th Baronet, MP (1632/1633 – 17 February 1708) was a British nobleman, and a Royalist and Tory politician.

Life
Born at Berry Pomeroy Castle in Devon, of a family greatly influential in the Western counties, he was the eldest son of Sir Edward Seymour, 3rd Baronet, and his wife Anne Portman, and a descendant of Edward Seymour, 1st Duke of Somerset, in the senior line. (Because of the alleged adultery of the Duke's first wife, the Dukedom had been entailed with preference to his sons by his second marriage.)

Seymour first sat in parliament in 1661 for Hindon, Wiltshire, a constituency near Maiden Bradley where the family had their principal residence at Bradley House. For much of the rest of his life he represented at various times the Devon county constituency, Totnes and Exeter. A skilled debater and politician, he was twice Speaker of the House of Commons during the Cavalier Parliament, the first non-lawyer to be chosen for that position for a considerable time.

Seymour was a signatory to The Several Declarations of The Company of Royal Adventurers of England Trading into Africa, a document published in 1667 which led to the expansion of the Royal Africa Company.

He was one of the Lords Commissioners of the Admiralty from 1673 until 1679, when he was made a Privy Counsellor. He also held office as Treasurer of the Navy from 1673 until 1681, Lord Commissioner of the Treasury from 15 November 1690 to 2 May 1696 and Comptroller of the Household from 1702 to 1704. He was also responsible for the Habeas Corpus Act 1679.

Though able, Seymour's character was marred by his haughty pride in his ancestry (much like his cousin, the 6th Duke of Somerset) and by venality. However, his influence was much courted, and he led a powerful faction of Western members in Parliament. An opponent of the Exclusion Bill and a quintessential country gentleman, his Tory credentials were impeccable. Samuel Pepys in his Diary records the unpleasant impression Seymour's arrogance made on most people who met him; nearly 40 years later the Duke of Marlborough wrote that while one should not wish for any person's death, he was sure that Seymour's death would be no great loss.

From the security of this position, Seymour moved that the Loyal Parliament investigate the irregularities surrounding the election of its members before it granted any revenues to James II, but as no other member dared to second it, it brought about no immediate consequence. He continued to oppose the arbitrary measures of James throughout his reign.

During the Glorious Revolution, he was one of the first Tories to declare for the Prince of Orange. The remarks that supposedly passed between the two on the first meeting are indicative of his pride of birth: "I think, Sir Edward," said the Prince, "that you are of the family of the Duke of Somerset." "Pardon me, your highness," replied Seymour, "the Duke of Somerset is of my family." However, he adhered to the Tory party, acting as a sort of whip or manager, and remained a vigorous rhetorical opponent of the Whig. He particularly attacked Lord Somers, the Chancellor, and managed the several attempts made to remove him from office. In 1699, the death of his third son, Popham Seymour-Conway, from the effects of a wound incurred in a duel with Captain George Kirk, prompted him to make an attack upon the standing army. His vigorous defence of his friend Sir Richard Reynell, 1st Baronet, Lord Chief Justice of Ireland, against the absurd charge that he had conspired to kill William of Orange, shows his eloquence in debate and a loyalty to old friends with which he is not always credited.

He seems to have suffered from diabetes in later life, an exchange of wit between Seymour and his physician, Dr. Ratcliffe, being recorded in Joe Miller's Jests. He died at Bradley House.

Family
On 7 September 1661, he married Margaret Wale (d. before 1674), daughter of Sir William Wale, of North Lappenham, Rutland, Alderman of London, and wife, and sister of Elizabeth Wale, married to the Hon. Henry Noel, of North Luffenham, Rutland, Member of Parliament, by whom he had two children:
Sir Edward Seymour, 5th Baronet (1663–1741), father of Edward Seymour,  8th Duke of Somerset
Lt.-Gen. William Seymour (1664–1728)

In 1674, he married Laetitia Popham (d. 16 March 1714), daughter of Alexander Popham and his wife Letitia Carre, by whom he had seven children:
Col. Popham Seymour-Conway (1675–1699)
Francis Seymour-Conway, 1st Baron Conway (1679–1732), father of Francis Seymour, 1st Marquess of Hertford 
Charles Seymour, of Staston, Dorset, married and had a daughter:
Jane Seymour, m. August 1750 Admiral Thomas Lynn
Anne Seymour (d. 10 May 1752), married 8 January 1707/1708 William Berkeley (who in 1735 changed his name to William Portman and was thereafter also known as William Berkeley-Portman), of Pylle and Orchard Portman, Somerset (d. 1737), son of Edward Berkeley, of Pylle, Somerset (d. 1707) and wife Elizabeth Ryves (d. 1724), by whom she had a son
Henry Seymour, died without male issue
Alexander Seymour, died without male issue
John Seymour, died young

References

1633 births
1708 deaths
17th-century Royal Navy personnel
Baronets in the Baronetage of England
Edward Seymour, 4th baronet
Lords of the Admiralty
Members of the Privy Council of England
Speakers of the House of Commons of England
English MPs 1661–1679
English MPs 1679
English MPs 1680–1681
English MPs 1685–1687
English MPs 1689–1690
English MPs 1690–1695
English MPs 1695–1698
English MPs 1698–1700
English MPs 1701
English MPs 1701–1702
English MPs 1702–1705
English MPs 1705–1707
British MPs 1707–1708
Members of the Parliament of England for Hindon
Members of the Parliament of England (pre-1707) for Devon
Members of the Parliament of England (pre-1707) for Totnes
Members of the Parliament of England (pre-1707) for Exeter
Members of the Parliament of Great Britain for Exeter